The Domkonzerte Königslutter have been the annual music festival in the Kaiserdom at Königslutter in Lower Saxony district of Helmstedt since 1980.

History 
The Domkonzerte Königslutter were established in 1980. Since then, six to ten events have been held annually for a fortnight in September in the Kaiserdom Königslutter as well as in the cloister and other venues. In addition to concerts of various genres such as classical music, klezmer, salon music, a cappella, gospel and church music, festival worships with musical accompaniment and literature readings are offered on two Sundays.

Since 2016, Thomas Krause has been artistic director of the Königslutter Cathedral Concerts.

Artists (selection) 

Sponsorship 
The Domkonzerte Königslutter are supported by the city of Königslutter, the "Verein Domkonzerte Königslutter e.V.", the "Domgemeinde Königslutter", the Stiftung Braunschweigischer Kulturbesitz as owner of the property as well as numerous sponsors and patrons.

References

External links 
 Domkonzerte Königslutter 
 Kaiserdom Königslutter
 Internationale Orgelwochen Königslutter
 Dom-Café Königslutter

Classical music festivals in Germany
Lower Saxony
1980 establishments in Germany